Tuitionkit is a UK-based online learning website for academic subjects such as English, Mathematics and Science. The website mainly focuses on structured video learning.

History
The website was founded in 2015 by Leon Hady, a former UK headteacher. Tuitionkit started as a self-funded venture allowing students to view interactive video content to support revision in Maths, English and Science for GCSE and A Levels. As of November 2016 it has 20,000 users.

Leon, who has been guiding pupils online since 2009 through YouTube channels, founded the website with the core focus of building a video platform that avoided displaying adverts to students (such as in the case of viewing tutorials on websites like YouTube) as well as making it a cheap alternative to in-person tuition.

The Tuitionkit subscription service allows students to watch over 2,000 tutorials as well as review more than 500 model exam question answers. Additionally, this is done with a track of the students' learning progress and an in-video questioning. The website also includes additional tools for teachers to use and teacher training videos.

Future expansions of the website include learning rooms in Egypt and Brazil among others.

References

British educational websites